Carolyn Kagan is a UK community psychologist and social activist.

Life and work
Carolyn Morag Kagan grew up in Meopham, Kent.  After working as a residential social worker in Scotland she went to North East London Polytechnic graduating with a degree in Psychology in 1974.  She then obtained a DPhil in Social Psychology from Wolfson College, University of Oxford.

In 1976 she was appointed to the Department of Psychology at Manchester Polytechnic (subsequently Manchester Metropolitan University) proceeding through the ranks of Lecturer, Senior Lecturer, Principal Lecturer and Professor.  She is a qualified social worker and counselling psychologist. For ten years she was Director of the Research Institute for Health and Social Change at MMU which established a reputation for socially engaged research. She is currently Emerita Professor at MMU  and a visiting professor at Edge Hill University.

As a community psychologist she has worked closely with various community groups and been involved in various forms of social activism.  She has until recently been a Director of Just Psychology CIC (www.justpsychology.co.uk), From Generation to Generation (https://web.archive.org/web/20180815165023/http://www.fromgenerationtogeneration.org/) and Friends of Hough End Hall (www.houghendhall.org).  She is also a trustee of the Richard Benmjamin Trust (www.richardbenjamintrust.co.uk), a member of the Steady State Manchester collective (https://steadystatemanchester.net) and Chair of Chorlton Voice (Chorlton Civic Society) and Chorlton Arts Festival

Publications

 Kagan C. et al. (Eds.) (2022). The Routledge International Handbook of Community Psychology.  Routledge.
 Kagan, C., Burton, M. H., Duckett, P., Lawthom, R., & Siddiquee, A. (2019). Critical Community Psychology: Critical Action and Social Change. (2nd ed) ROUTLEDGE.
 Kagan, C. and Diamond, J. (2019). University–Community Relations in the UK. Palgrave-Macmillan
 Kagan, C., Burton, M., Duckett, P., Lawthom, R., & Siddiquee, A (2011). Critical Community Psychology. Wiley-Blackwell.
 Burton, M., Kagan, C., & Clements, P. (1995). Social Skills for People With Learning Disabilities. Nelson Thornes.
See also Carolyn Kagan's page on academia.edu https://mmu.academia.edu/CarolynKagan

Awards
 1987 Liverpool University Penelope Hall Prize (for outstanding work in social work training )

 2005 British Psychological Society Award for Promoting Equal Opportunity (for the development of academic and research alliances)

 2006 Fellowship, Society Community Research and Action (SCRA) (for internationally renowned work in community psychology)

 2017 Honorary Fellowship, British Psychological Society

References

1950 births
British psychologists
Academics of Manchester Metropolitan University
Living people
Alumni of the University of East London
Alumni of Wolfson College, Oxford